Hans Kennert Mattias Hedarv Karlsson (born 17 August 1977) is a Swedish politician who served as Leader of the Sweden Democrats in the Riksdag from September 2014 to November 2019. He has been a Member of the Riksdag (SD)since October 2010. He previously served as Leader of the Sweden Democrats from 2014 to 2015. He currently heads the conservative think-tank Oikos. Since 2022, he has also served as the party's international outreach secretary.

Early life
Karlsson was born in Rottne, Växjö Municipality, Kronoberg County. At age 16, he moved to the nearby city of Växjö to begin secondary school at Katedral gymnasium. Karlsson reported having gained his political convictions during his years in Växjö as a result of conflicts with immigrant "kickers" gangs and resentment towards the lack of Swedish pride and solidarity in society. He described having been inspired by Swedish Viking rock band Ultima Thule. Karlsson claims to have never associated with the sizable neo-Nazi skinhead scene that mobilized during his youth, and claims to have been called a "meatball patriot" by racist skinheads for his moderate and more accepting ideology.

Following secondary studies, Karlsson moved to Madrid, where he studied during one year. He returned to Sweden in 1999 to Lund, Scania County, enrolling into history and political science at Lund University. During his studies at the university, Karlsson met Jimmie Åkesson, incumbent leader of the Sweden Democrats, Richard Jomshof and Björn Söder.

Karlsson describes his early childhood in Rottne as inspiring his later political action:

Political career
Karlsson first joined the Sweden Democrats in 1999. His first important impact within the Sweden Democrats came in 2002, when he alongside Jimmie Åkesson and former leader Mikael Jansson reshaped the party's political programme. According to Expo, Karlsson also wrote the Sweden Democrats' election manifesto for to the 2006 general election. Since 2008, he is recognized as the leading ideologue of the Sweden Democrats, after its former chief ideologue Johan Rinderheim was forced to leave the party.

Before the Sweden Democrats' entered the Riksdag in 2010, Karlsson worked as a political secretary for the Sweden Democrats council group in Malmö Municipality. He was the party's press secretary at the national level from 2004 to 2010. After the 2010 general election, Karlsson was elected as a Member of the Riksdag (SD). In 2012, Karlsson was appointed deputy leader of the Sweden Democrats in the Riksdag.

Following the 2014 general election, Karlsson was re-elected to the Riksdag. On 29 September 2014, he was appointed leader of the Sweden Democrats in the Riksdag.

In February 2017, Karlsson penned a letter to The Wall Street Journal, along with fellow Sweden Democrats politician Jimmie Åkesson agreeing with President Donald Trump's assertions that Sweden is undergoing a Muslim immigrant-led crime crisis stating: "Mr. Trump did not exaggerate Sweden’s current problems. If anything, he understated them."

Karlsson has also expressed opposition to the European Union and defended Brexit. In a 2017 interview with The Daily Express he argued the EU should not punish Britain for its vote and described the EU as a "zombie," stating "it’s actually dead but still walking. But in the end, it will show that this kind of structure is not sustainable. I think it will fall."

On 13 March 2019, Karlsson announced that he would be stepping down as the leader of the Sweden Democrats in the Riksdag. This was officially confirmed on 24 November. His successor was Henrik Vinge.

In February 2020, Karlsson announced his new think-tank Oikos, with members on the steering board such as Malcom Kyeyune, Asle Toje, the ethnographer Dan Korn, and the leader of New Direction, Naweed Khan.

Further reading
Teitelbaum, Benjamin (2013). “Come Hear Our Merry Song:” Shifts in the Sound of Contemporary Swedish Radical Nationalism. Ph.D. Dissertation, Brown University.

References

External links
Mattias Karlsson at the Riksdag 

Living people
1977 births
Members of the Riksdag from the Sweden Democrats
People from Växjö Municipality
Lund University alumni
Critics of multiculturalism
21st-century Swedish politicians